IcyOwl is an open-source C++ Integrated Development Environment(IDE) distributed under GNU General Public License. It is written in C++ and wxWidgets API. IcyOwl is Cross-Platform, which means that it runs on many Operating System such as Microsoft Windows and Linux. Mac OS port is still unavailable as of now.

It uses doxygen to generate class tree, but only supports one compiler, that is GCC/MinGW.

It is now going through a major code changes since the developer saw problems implementing the class browser using doxygen.

Features

Uses MinGW on Windows
Uses GCC on linux
Syntax highlighting
Code completion
Class browser
Project Manager
Auto generation of Makefile

See also
C++
List of integrated development environments
Comparison of integrated development environments
wxWidgets
Scintilla
SourceForge

External links
IcyOwl Homepage
IcyOwl Homepage (Alternate Sourceforge address)

Integrated development environments
Free integrated development environments
Linux integrated development environments
Software that uses wxWidgets